Ajim is a commune and port located on the Island of Djerba off the coast of Tunisia. It is Djerba's main fishing port and the closest city to the African continent. It had a population of 24,294 at the 2014 census.

Star Wars filming location
The city and surrounding areas were used as filming locations for Star Wars. Tourists can visit buildings featured in the original movie, including Obi-Wan Kenobi's house and the Mos Eisley cantina.

Topographic map and satellite view

References

Populated places in Tunisia
Communes of Tunisia
Djerba